This is a list of singles and some albums recorded and released by Frankie Valli and/or The Four Seasons in their various guises since 1953.  This list includes only commercially released singles on which Valli or some configuration of the group was credited with performing or producing. Promotional-only releases and extended play records (EPs) are omitted from this list.

Reissued singles and records in which the Four Lovers did only session work (including singles by Danny & the Juniors, Freddy Cannon, and Bobby Darin) are also not included here.

Albums

Studio albums

The Four Lovers

The Four Seasons

Frankie Valli

Live albums

The Four Seasons

Compilation albums

Singles
NOTE: Peak chart positions are from the Billboard Hot 100 chart. The UK chart positions of three singles are noted ("You're Ready Now", "Sleeping Man" and "The Night") because of their uniqueness in The Four Seasons/Frankie Valli history. Their chart positions come from the book Guinness British Hit Singles by Paul Gambaccini, Tim Rice and Jo Rice (sixth edition 1987).

The Four Lovers

The Romans

The Four Seasons

1960s

1970s

1980s–1994

Frankie Valli

Singles released under other names

1965–present

Notes

Other appearances

Topix/Perri releases
(Two independent labels owned by Bob Crewe and distributed by London. Tommy DeVito, Bob Gaudio, Nick Massi and Frankie Valli provided, together and separately, instrumental backing and background vocals for a variety of artists.  Occasionally, they would be given performing credit under different names)

Miss Frankie Nolan
(background vocals by The 4 Seasons)

References

Further reading

Joe Sasfy, Liner notes to Frankie Valli & the Four Seasons: 1962-1967 (Warner Special Products, 1987: Time-Life Music The Rock 'N' Era 2RNR-15)

External links
 Singles list at discogs.com
 Frankie Valli singles list at discogs.com

 
Rock music group discographies
Discographies of American artists